Wohyń  is a village in Radzyń Podlaski County, Lublin Voivodeship, in eastern Poland. It is the seat of the gmina (administrative district) called Gmina Wohyń.

The village has a population of 2,000.

References

Villages in Radzyń Podlaski County
Brest Litovsk Voivodeship
Lublin Governorate
Lublin Voivodeship (1919–1939)
Shtetls